A riffle is a shallow landform in a flowing channel.

Riffle may also refer to:

Riffle, Illinois, United States, an unincorporated community
Riffle, West Virginia, United States, an unincorporated community 
Riffle (anonymity network)
Shuffling § Riffle, a shuffling technique in cards
Charley Riffle (1918–2002), American football player (guard for Notre Dame) 
Dick Riffle (1915–1981), American football player (running back for the Philadelphia Eagles and the Pittsburgh Steelers) 
In gold mining, a barrier on a sluice box

See also
Rifle (disambiguation)
Ripple (disambiguation)